Michael da Conceição Figueiredo (born 26 September 1987 in Lyon, France), known as Mika, is a Portuguese professional footballer who plays for Lusitânia F.C. as a central defender.

References

External links

1987 births
Living people
French people of Portuguese descent
Portuguese footballers
Footballers from Lyon
Association football defenders
Primeira Liga players
Liga Portugal 2 players
Segunda Divisão players
Campeonato de Portugal (league) players
C.D. Feirense players
F.C. Arouca players
C.D. Trofense players
S.C. Freamunde players
Lusitânia F.C. players